Garfinkel is a Yiddish surname with variants Garfinkle, Garfinckel, Gurfinkel, Gorfinkel, Garfield etc. Notable people with the surname include:

 Charles B. Garfinkel (1890–1969), New York assemblyman
 Harold Garfinkel  (1917–2011) sociologist
 Jack Garfinkel (1918–2013), American basketball player
Lenora Garfinkel (1930–2020), American architect
 Marian Garfinkel, yoga practitioner who pioneered the use of yoga to treat carpal tunnel
 Simson Garfinkel, computer scientist, journalist and writer specializing in the field of computer security
 Yosef Garfinkel, Israeli archaeologist

Variant forms
Garfinkle

 John Garfield (born Garfinkle), American actor
 Norton Garfinkle, economist
 Richard Garfinkle, American science-fiction author

Garfinckel
 Julius Garfinckel (born Garfinkel), American merchant, founder of Washington, D.C., based department store chain, Garfinckel's

Gurfinkel
 David Gurfinkel (born 1938), Israeli cinematographer
 Goldie Steinberg (née Gurfinkel), Moldovan-born American supercentenarian
 Josefa Gurfinkel (1919–1997), Soviet chess master
 Yisrael Guri (born Gurfinkel), Russian-born Israeli politician

Gorfinkel
 Jordan B. Gorfinkel, aka "Gorf," (born July 7, 1967), American comic book creator, newspaper cartoonist, animation and multi-media entertainment producer.

Garfield
 Andrew Garfield, (born August 20, 1983), Tony, BAFTA TV and Golden Globe Award-winning English and American actor.

See also 
 Garfunkel
 Finkelstein
 Finkel

References

Germanic-language surnames
Jewish surnames
Yiddish-language surnames